Elizabeth is a city and the county seat of Union County, in the U.S. state of New Jersey. As of the 2020 U.S. census, the city had a total population of 137,298, making it New Jersey's fourth-most-populous city, after neighboring Newark, Jersey City, and Paterson. The 2020 population was an increase of 12,329 (9.9%) from the 124,969 counted in the 2010 census. The Census Bureau's Population Estimates Program calculated that the city's population was 135,407 in 2021, ranking the city the 207th-most-populous in the country.

History

Elizabeth, originally called "Elizabethtown" and part of the Elizabethtown Tract, was founded in 1664 by English settlers.  The town was not named for Queen Elizabeth I as many people may assume, but rather for Elizabeth, wife of Sir George Carteret, one of the two original Proprietors of the colony of New Jersey. She was the daughter of Philippe de Carteret II, 3rd Seigneur de Sark and Anne Dowse. The town served as the first capital of New Jersey. During the American Revolutionary War, Elizabethtown was continually attacked by British forces based on Manhattan and Staten Island, culminating in the Battle of Springfield which decisively defeated British attempts to gain New Jersey. After independence, it was from Elizabethtown that George Washington embarked by boat to Manhattan for his 1789 inauguration. There are numerous memorials and monuments of the American Revolution in Elizabeth.

On March 13, 1855, the City of Elizabeth was created by an act of the New Jersey Legislature, combining and replacing both Elizabeth Borough (which dated back to 1740) and Elizabeth Township (which had been formed in 1693), subject to the results of a referendum held on March 27, 1855. On March 19, 1857, the city became part of the newly created Union County. Portions of the city were taken to form Linden Township on March 4, 1861.

The first major industry, the Singer Sewing Machine Company came to Elizabeth and employed as many as 2,000 people. In 1895, it saw one of the first car companies, when Electric Carriage and Wagon Company was founded to manufacture the Electrobat, joined soon by another electric car builder, Andrew L. Riker. The Electric Boat Company got its start building submarines for the United States Navy in Elizabeth, New Jersey, beginning with the launch of USS Holland (SS-1) in 1897. These pioneering naval craft [known as A-Class] were developed at Lewis Nixon's Crescent Shipyard in Elizabeth between the years 1896–1903. Elizabeth grew in parallel to its sister city of Newark for many years, but has been more successful in retaining a middle-class presence and was mostly  spared riots in the 1960s.

On September 18, 2016, a backpack holding five bombs was discovered outside NJ Transit's Elizabeth train station. One bomb detonated accidentally when a bomb squad robot failed to disarm the contents of the backpack; no one was hurt. Police were initially unsure if this event was related to bombs in Seaside Park, New Jersey and Manhattan that had exploded the previous day. On September 19, police arrested Ahmad Khan Rahami, a 28-year-old Afghan-born naturalized U.S. citizen, for questioning in connection with all three incidents; the FBI considered Rahami, whose last known address was within  of the train station, to be armed and dangerous.

Geography
According to the U.S. Census Bureau, the city had a total area of 13.66 square miles (35.37 km2), including 12.32 square miles (31.91 km2) of land and 1.34 square miles (3.46 km2) of water (9.78%).

Elizabeth is bordered to the southwest by Linden, to the west by Roselle and Roselle Park, to the northwest by Union and Hillside, to the north by Newark (in Essex County). To the east the city is across Newark Bay from Bayonne in Hudson County and the Arthur Kill from Staten Island, New York.

Districts and neighborhoods

Midtown / Uptown

Midtown, also occasionally known as Uptown, is the main commercial district and a historic section as well. It includes the First Presbyterian Church and St. John's Episcopal Church, and its St. John's Episcopal Churchyard. The First Presbyterian Church was a battleground for the American Revolution. Located here are also the 1931 Art Deco Hersh Tower, the Thomas Jefferson Arts Academy, and the Ritz Theatre which has been operating since 1926. Midtown/Uptown includes the area once known as "Brittanville" which contained many English type gardens.

Bayway
Bayway is located in the southern part of the city and borders the City of Linden. From US 1&9 and Allen Street, between the Elizabeth River and the Arthur Kill, it has maintained a strong Polish community for years.  Developed at the turn of the 20th century, many of the area residents once worked  at the refinery which straddles both Elizabeth and Linden.  There are unique ethnic restaurants, bars, and stores along Bayway, and a variety of houses of worship. Housing styles are older and well maintained. There are many affordable two to four-family housing units, and multiple apartment complexes. The western terminus of the Goethals Bridge, which spans the Arthur Kill to Staten Island can be found here. A small section of the neighborhood was isolated with both the completion of the Goethals Bridge in 1928 and the construction of the New Jersey Turnpike in the 1950s.

Downtown / Elizabethport

Downtown / E-Port (a.k.a. The Port and Elizabethport) is the oldest neighborhood and perhaps the most diverse place in Elizabeth. It consists of a collection of old world Elizabethan, new American colonial-style houses and apartment buildings that stretch east of 7th Street to its shores. The name is derived from its dependence on businesses catering to seagoing ventures. It was a thriving center of commerce between the 1660s through the middle of the 20th century. This area has had a great deal of improvement since 2000. Many homes have been renovated or been replaced with new, more ornate structures. Federal housing projects that stood for decades along First Street have been demolished and replaced with low to moderate income housing. The waterfront is home to new town homes and two-family homes (duplexes).

The area was once three distinct neighborhoods: Buckeye, Diamondville and New Mexico. It was the US home of the Singer Manufacturing Company, makers of Singer sewing machines, which constructed a  facility on a  site in 1873. Shortly after it opened, the factory manufactured the majority of all sewing machines worldwide. With 6,000 employees working there in the 1870s, it employed the largest number of workers at a single facility in 1873. The company moved out of Elizabeth in 1982.

Elizabeth Marina, which was once filled with trash and debris along its walkway, was also restored. It is the site of year-round celebrations from a Hispanic festival in late spring to the lighting of a Christmas tree in winter. Living conditions in this area continue to improve year after year. Historically, there were immigrant communities centered around Christian churches. The Slavic community was centered by Sts. Peter and Paul Byzantine, the Lithuanian community attended Sts. Peter and Paul Roman Catholic and the Polish community attended St. Adalbert Roman Catholic Church which still stands. St. Patrick Church, originally Irish, dominates the 'Port; the cornerstone for the second and current building was laid in 1887.

Elmora and The West End

Elmora is a middle/working-class neighborhood in the western part of Elizabeth. The main thoroughfare, Elmora Avenue, boasts some of the best restaurants, shops and boutiques. A few of the city's most luxurious high-rise building complexes, affording views of the New York skyline, dot the edge of this neighborhood and are convenient to the Midtown NJ Transit Train Station.  The neighborhood area forms a "V" from its approximate borders of the Central RR tracks to Rahway Avenue.

Modern Orthodox community in Elmora
The Elmora section of Elizabeth is home to a large Modern Orthodox community. The Jewish Educational Center of Elizabeth was founded in 1941 by a Latvian-born rabbi, Pinchas Mordechai Teitz, who arrived to lecture in to the city's then-small Orthodox community in the 1930s.

Elmora Hills
The northwestern part of Elmora is known as Elmora Hills. It is a strongly middle- to upper-middle-class neighborhood.
Originally called Shearerville, the name Elmora came from the developers of the area, the El Mora Land Company. This area was annexed from Union, returning to Elizabeth in the early part of the 20th century.  This was done to increase the city's tax base as major improvements to infrastructure were necessary at the time.

Frog Hollow
Frog Hollow is a small community of homes east of Atlantic Street, west of the Arthur Kill, and south of Elizabeth Avenue. Its name is derived from the excellent frog catching in its marshes as well as the excellent oyster and fishing of the past. The area expanded east and includes the area formerly known as Helltown.  Helltown included many of the docks and shipyards, as well as several drydocks. The area's developer was Edward N. Kellogg, who also laid out the neighborhood in Keighry Head. Frog Hollow contains older-style, affordable homes, rentals, and some quality restaurants in a working-class community. The statue honoring former Mayor Mack on Elizabeth Avenue is a landmark in the community. Frog Hollow is also convenient to the Veteran's Memorial Waterfront Park.

Keighry Head
Its name is attributed to James Keighry of the Isle of Kerry, Ireland. He was a notable resident who owned a business facing the square formed at the junction of Jackson, Madison, Chestnut and Magnolia Avenues. The approximate borders of this neighborhood extended north from East Grand Street to Flora Street and from Walnut to Division Street. Developed by Edward N. Kellogg, many of the streets were named after family and friends.  Keighry Head is located close to Midtown, containing affordable one and two-family homes, and apartment houses, convenient to the Midtown shopping district, and transportation.

North End / North Elizabeth
The North End, also known as "North Elizabeth", is a diverse working-class neighborhood. The borders are approximately the Arch north to the city line between North Broad Street and US 1&9.  It was developed mostly in the 1920s for workers in the Duesenberg automobile plant (later Durant Auto, Burry Biscuits and Interbake Foods). The area was heavily settled by the Irish and then Portuguese.  The North End has easy access to New York and Newark via its own NJ Transit train station, Routes 1&9 and the NJ Turnpike. The neighborhood also has Crane Square, the Historic Nugents Tavern, and Kellogg Park and its proximity to Newark Liberty International Airport. There is currently a plan in place to develop the former Interbake Foods facility into shopping and residential townhouses and condominiums. This community contains many larger one and two-family homes that have been rebuilt over the past decade. North Elizabeth also features many well-kept apartment houses and condominium units on and around North Avenue that are home to professionals who work in New York or the area. The only Benedictine women's community in New Jersey is located at Saint Walburga Monastery on North Broad Street.

Peterstown

Peterstown (also known as "The Burg") is a middle/working-class neighborhood in the southeastern part of the city. Its borders run west of Atlantic Street to South Spring Street from 1st Avenue to the Elizabeth River. Its name is derived from John Peters, who owned most of the land with George Peters.  They divided the land and developed it during the end of the 19th century. The area was once predominantly occupied by its earliest settlers, who were German, and during the 1920s was gentrified by newly immigrated Italians. Peterstown has clean, quiet streets and has many affordable housing opportunities with a "village" feel. The area contains the historic Union Square, which is home to produce stands, meat markets, fresh fish and poultry stores. Peterstown is also home of the DeCavalcante crime family, one of the most infamous Mafia families in the United States.

The Point / the Crossroads
The Point, formally known as the Crossroads, is centrally located and defined by New Point Road and Division Street. It is close to Midtown and contains many new affordable two-family homes, apartment houses and is undergoing a transformation. The former Elizabeth General Hospital site is currently being demolished and awaiting a new development.

Quality Hill
Home to St. Mary's and the "Hilltoppers", this area once was lined with mansions. Its approximate borders were South Broad Street to Grier Avenue and Pearl Street to what is now US 1&9. During its development in the 1860s it was the most fashionable area of the city to live. It is now a quiet middle class community experiencing a re-development with many new condominiums.

Westminster
Developed by Edward J. Grassman, Westminster got its name from the city's largest residential estates of the Tudor style and was inhabited by many residents who traced their ancestry to England. This neighborhood borders Hillside with the Elizabeth River running its border creating a dramatic splash of greenery and rolling hills off of North Avenue, near Liberty Hall. Residents use this area for recreation, whether it is at the newly christened Phil Rizzuto Park area, or for bird watching or for sunbathing by the river. It is one of the more affluent areas of Elizabeth.

Climate
The climate in this area is characterized by hot, humid summers and cool to cold winters. According to the Köppen Climate Classification system, Elizabeth straddles the boundary between a humid subtropical climate and a hot-summer humid continental climate.

Demographics

In 2019, the foreign-born population in the city was 46.6% of the total population, and the Latino population was 65%.

2010 census

The Census Bureau's 2006–2010 American Community Survey showed that (in 2010 inflation-adjusted dollars) median household income was $43,770 (with a margin of error of +/− $1,488) and the median family income was $46,891 (+/− $1,873). Males had a median income of $32,268 (+/− $1,205) versus $27,228 (+/− $1,427) for females. The per capita income for the borough was $19,196 (+/− $604). About 14.7% of families and 16.7% of the population were below the poverty line, including 23.5% of those under age 18 and 18.5% of those age 65 or over.

2000 census
As of the 2000 United States census there were 120,568 people, 40,482 households, and 28,175 families residing in the city. The population density was 9,865.5 inhabitants per square mile (3,809.5/km2). There were 42,838 housing units at an average density of 3,505.2 per square mile (1,353.5/km2). The racial makeup of the city was 55.78% White, 19.98% Black or African American, 0.48% Native American, 2.35% Asian, 0.05% Pacific Islander, 15.51% from other races, and 5.86% from two or more races. Hispanic or Latino of any race were 49.46% of the population.

Colombia is the nation of birth for the highest number of foreign-born inhabitants of Elizabeth: it was the birthplace of 8,731 Elizabeth residents as of the 2000 Census. This exceeded the combined total of 8,214 for Mexican and Central American immigrants. It also far exceeded the next highest single nation count of Cuba at 5,812. The highest number for a non-Spanish speaking country and third highest overall was Portugal, whose native-born immigrants numbered 4,544. The next largest groups were Salvadoran immigrants numbering 4,043, Peruvians at 3,591 and Dominican immigrants, of whom there were 3,492.

There were 40,482 households, out of which 36.6% had children under the age of 18 living with them, 42.9% were married couples living together, 19.1% had a female householder with no husband present, and 30.4% were non-families. 24.6% of all households were made up of individuals, and 8.4% had someone living alone who was 65 years of age or older. The average household size was 2.91 and the average family size was 3.45.

In the city the population was spread out, with 26.3% under the age of 18, 10.8% from 18 to 24, 33.7% from 25 to 44, 19.3% from 45 to 64, and 10.0% who were 65 years of age or older. The median age was 33 years. For every 100 females, there were 98.0 males. For every 100 females age 18 and over, there were 96.1 males.

The median income for a household in the city was $35,175, and the median income for a family was $38,370. Males had a median income of $30,757 versus $23,931 for females. The per capita income for the city was $15,114. About 15.6% of families and 17.8% of the population were below the poverty line, including 22.2% of those under age 18 and 17.2% of those age 65 or over.

Economy

Since World War II, Elizabeth has seen its transportation facilities grow; the Port Newark-Elizabeth Marine Terminal is one of the busiest ports in the world, as is Newark Liberty International Airport, located in both Newark and Elizabeth. Elizabeth also features Little Jimmy's Italian Ices (since 1932), The Mills At Jersey Gardens outlet mall, Loews Theater, and the Elizabeth Center, which generate millions of dollars in revenue. Companies based in Elizabeth included New England Motor Freight.

Celadon, a mixed-use development containing 14 glass skyscrapers, offices, retail, a hotel, boardwalk and many other amenities is proposed to border the east side of The Mills at Jersey Gardens, directly on the Port Newark Bay. Groundbreaking was scheduled for the summer of 2008 on the ferry, roads and parking, and construction was planned to continue for at least twelve years. As of 2021 this project has not started construction and there is no recent news about Celadon, so it is assumed that this project has been canceled

Portions of the city are part of an Urban Enterprise Zone (UEZ), one of 32 zones covering 37 municipalities statewide. Elizabeth was selected in 1983 as one of the initial group of 10 zones chosen to participate in the program. In addition to other benefits to encourage employment and investment within the Zone, shoppers can take advantage of a reduced 3.3125% sales tax rate (half of the % rate charged statewide) at eligible merchants. Established in November 1992, the city's Urban Enterprise Zone status expires in November 2023.

Government

Local government
The City of Elizabeth is governed within the Faulkner Act, formally known as the Optional Municipal Charter Law, under the Mayor-Council system of municipal government. The city is one of 71 municipalities (of the 564) statewide that use this form of government. The governing body is comprised of the Mayor and the City Council. The Elizabeth City Council is comprised of nine members, who are elected to serve four-year terms of office on a staggered basis with elections held in even-numbered years. The mayor and the three council members elected at-large come up for election together in leap years and two years later the six members who are elected from each of Elizabeth's six wards are all up for election.

, the city's Mayor is Democrat Chris Bollwage, a lifelong resident of Elizabeth who is serving his eighth term as Mayor, serving a term of office that ends December 31, 2024. City Council members are Council President Patricia Perkins-Auguste (at-large; D, 2024), Carlos Cedeño (Fourth Ward; D, 2022), Frank J. Cuesta (at-large; D, 2024), William Gallman Jr. (Fifth Ward; D, 2022), Nelson Gonzalez (Second Ward; D, 2022), Manny Grova Jr. (at-large; D, 2024), Kevin Kiniery (Third Ward; D, 2022), Frank O. Mazza (Sixth Ward; D, 2022), and Carlos L. Torres (First Ward; D, 2022).

Bollwage, who has served as mayor of Elizabeth since 1992, was paid an annual salary of $152,564 in 2016, placing him among the three highest-paid mayors in the state and the only mayor in Union County to earn annual compensation in excess of $100,000.

Federal, state and county representation
Elizabeth is located in the 8th Congressional District and is part of New Jersey's 20th state legislative district.

 

Union County is governed by a Board of County Commissioners, whose nine members are elected at-large to three-year terms of office on a staggered basis with three seats coming up for election each year, with an appointed County Manager overseeing the day-to-day operations of the county. At an annual reorganization meeting held in the beginning of January, the board selects a Chair and Vice Chair from among its members. , Union County's County Commissioners are 
Chair Rebecca Williams (D, Plainfield, term as commissioner and as chair ends December 31, 2022), 
Vice Chair Christopher Hudak (D, Linden, term as commissioner ends 2023; term as vice chair ends 2022),
James E. Baker Jr. (D, Rahway, 2024),
Angela R. Garretson (D, Hillside, 2023),
Sergio Granados (D, Elizabeth, 2022),
Bette Jane Kowalski (D, Cranford, 2022), 
Lourdes M. Leon (D, Elizabeth, 2023),
Alexander Mirabella (D, Fanwood, 2024) and 
Kimberly Palmieri-Mouded (D, Westfield, 2024).
Constitutional officers elected on a countywide basis are
County Clerk Joanne Rajoppi (D, Union Township, 2025),
Sheriff Peter Corvelli (D, Kenilworth, 2023) and
Surrogate Susan Dinardo (acting).
The County Manager is Edward Oatman.

Politics
As of March 23, 2011, there were a total of 44,415 registered voters in Elizabeth, of which 24,988 (56.3% vs. 41.8% countywide) were registered as Democrats, 2,430 (5.5% vs. 15.3%) were registered as Republicans and 16,985 (38.2% vs. 42.9%) were registered as Unaffiliated. There were 12 voters registered to other parties. Among the city's 2010 Census population, 35.5% (vs. 53.3% in Union County) were registered to vote, including 47.8% of those ages 18 and over (vs. 70.6% countywide).

In the 2012 presidential election, Democrat Barack Obama received 24,751 votes (80.8% vs. 66.0% countywide), ahead of Republican Mitt Romney with 5,213 votes (17.0% vs. 32.3%) and other candidates with 166 votes (0.5% vs. 0.8%), among the 30,640 ballots cast by the city's 50,715 registered voters, for a turnout of 60.4% (vs. 68.8% in Union County). In the 2008 presidential election, Democrat Barack Obama received 23,524 votes (74.3% vs. 63.1% countywide), ahead of Republican John McCain with 7,559 votes (23.9% vs. 35.2%) and other candidates with 202 votes (0.6% vs. 0.9%), among the 31,677 ballots cast by the city's 48,294 registered voters, for a turnout of 65.6% (vs. 74.7% in Union County). In the 2004 presidential election, Democrat John Kerry received 18,363 votes (67.2% vs. 58.3% countywide), ahead of Republican George W. Bush with 8,486 votes (31.0% vs. 40.3%) and other candidates with 144 votes (0.5% vs. 0.7%), among the 27,334 ballots cast by the city's 45,882 registered voters, for a turnout of 59.6% (vs. 72.3% in the whole county).

In the 2013 gubernatorial election, Democrat Barbara Buono received 63.2% of the vote (7,804 cast), ahead of Republican Chris Christie with 35.5% (4,379 votes), and other candidates with 1.3% (163 votes), among the 13,592 ballots cast by the city's 49,515 registered voters (1,246 ballots were spoiled), for a turnout of 27.5%. In the 2009 gubernatorial election, Democrat Jon Corzine received 10,258 ballots cast (66.8% vs. 50.6% countywide), ahead of Republican Chris Christie with 4,386 votes (28.6% vs. 41.7%), Independent Chris Daggett with 376 votes (2.4% vs. 5.9%) and other candidates with 131 votes (0.9% vs. 0.8%), among the 15,355 ballots cast by the city's 46,219 registered voters, yielding a 33.2% turnout (vs. 46.5% in the county).

Police department
The Elizabeth Police Department was established in May 1858.

The current Police Director is Earl Graves and the Chief of Police is Giacomo Sacca.

The Table of Organization authorizes 365 officers, including 9 captains, 21 lieutenants and 39 sergeants.

Fire department

The Elizabeth Fire Department provides fire protection and emergency medical services to the city of Elizabeth. The Elizabeth Fire Department was established as a volunteer organization in 1837 when Engine Company # 1 was organized. In 1901, the volunteer department was no longer adequate and the department reorganized into a paid department on January 1, 1902. There are 7 Engine Companies, 3 Ladder Companies, 1 Rescue Company, and several Special Units. These companies and units are under the command of both a Deputy Chief and two Battalion Chiefs.

The department is part of the Metro USAR Strike Team, which consists of nine North Jersey fire departments and other emergency services divisions working to address major emergency rescue situations.

Fire station locations and apparatus

Emergency medical services
Emergency medical services are provided by the Elizabeth Fire Department's Division of Emergency Medical Services. This is a civilian division of the fire department and handles approximately 20,000 calls a year. The division is made up of an EMS chief, 5 supervisors, 28 full-time emergency medical technicians, and approximately 12 per-diem EMTs. The division, at its maximum staffing, aims to operate five ambulances and a supervisor on days (7am–7pm) and three ambulances and a supervisor on nights (7pm–7am). They also operate the NJ EMS Task Force Medical Ambulance Bus #1.

Hatzalah of Union County provides EMS primarily to the Elmora Hills neighborhood of Elizabeth, and certain sections of Hillside, Union and Roselle Park.

Education

The city's public schools are operated by Elizabeth Public Schools, serving students in pre-kindergarten through twelfth grade. The district is one of 31 former Abbott districts statewide that were established pursuant to the decision by the New Jersey Supreme Court in Abbott v. Burke which are now referred to as "SDA Districts" based on the requirement for the state to cover all costs for school building and renovation projects in these districts under the supervision of the New Jersey Schools Development Authority. Administration and operation of the district is overseen by a nine-member board of education. The board appoints a superintendent to oversee the district's day-to-day operations and a business administrator to supervise the business functions of the district.

As of the 2018–19 school year, the district, comprised of 36 schools, had an enrollment of 28,712 students and 2,173.0 classroom teachers (on an FTE basis), for a student–teacher ratio of 13.2:1. High schools in the district (with 2018–19 enrollment data from the National Center for Education Statistics) are 
Elizabeth High School Frank J. Cicarell Aacdemy (1,152; 9–12), 
J. Christian Bollwage Finance Academy (420; 9–12), 
John E. Dwyer Technology Academy (1,340; 9–12), 
Thomas A. Edison Career and Technical Academy (872; 9–12), 
Admiral William F. Halsey Jr. Health and Public Safety Academy (1,111; 9–12), 
Alexander Hamilton Preparatory Academy (1,014; 9–12) and 
Thomas Jefferson Arts Academy (1,122; 9–12).

With 5,300 students, Elizabeth High School had been the largest high school in the state of New Jersey and one of the largest in the United States, and underwent a split that created five new academies and a smaller Elizabeth High School under a transformation program that began in the 2009–2010 school year. The school was the 294th-ranked public high school in New Jersey out of 322 schools statewide, in New Jersey Monthly magazine's September 2010 cover story on the state's "Top Public High Schools", after being ranked 302nd in 2008 out of 316 schools. Before the 2008–2009 school year, all of the district's schools (except high schools) became K–8 schools, replacing the middle schools and elementary schools. SchoolDigger.com ranked Elizabeth 449th of 558 districts evaluated in New Jersey.

These and other indicators reveal a seriously declining performance standard in the city's schools. Data reported by the state Department of Education showed that a majority of students in a majority of the Elizabeth public schools failed basic skills tests.

In the 2008–09 school year, Victor Mravlag Elementary School No. 21 was recognized with the Blue Ribbon School Award of Excellence by the United States Department of Education, the highest award an American school can receive. For the 2006–2007 school year, William F. Halloran Alternative School #22 was one of four schools in New Jersey recognized with the Blue Ribbon Award. William F. Halloran Alternative School #22 earned a second award when it was one of 11 in the state to be recognized in 2014 by the National Blue Ribbon Schools Program. Terence C. Reilly School No. 7 was honored by the National Blue Ribbon Schools Program in 2019, one of nine schools in the state recognized as Exemplary High Performing Schools; the school had previously won the honor in 2013.

Private schools
Elizabeth is also home to several private schools. The coeducational St. Mary of the Assumption High School, which was established 1930, and the all-girls Benedictine Academy, which is run by the Benedictine Sisters of Saint Walburga Monastery, both operate under the auspices of the Roman Catholic Archdiocese of Newark. The Newark Archdiocese also operates the K–8 schools Our Lady of Guadalupe Academy and St. Genevieve School, which was founded in 1926.

Saint Patrick High School was closed by the Newark Archdiocese in June 2012 due to increasing costs and declining enrollment. Administrators and parents affiliated with the defunct school came together to open an independent non-denominational school on Morris Avenue called "The Patrick School" in September 2012.

The Benedictine Preschool, operated by the Benedictine Sisters, is housed at Saint Walburga Monastery.

The Jewish Educational Center comprises the Yeshiva of Elizabeth (nursery through sixth grades), the Rav Teitz Mesivta Academy (for boys in grades 6–12) and Bruriah High School (for girls in grades 7–12).

Princeton University was founded in 1746 in Elizabeth as the College of New Jersey.

Libraries
The Elizabeth Public Library, the free public library with a main library, originally a Carnegie library, and three branches had a collection of 384,000 volumes and annual circulation of about 115,000 in 2016.

Transportation

Roads and highways

Elizabeth is a hub of several major roadways including the New Jersey Turnpike / Interstate 95, Interstate 278 (including the Goethals Bridge, which carries Interstate 278 over the Arthur Kill between Elizabeth and Howland Hook, Staten Island), U.S. Route 1/9, Route 27, Route 28, and Route 439.  Elizabeth's own street plan, in contrast to the more usual grid plan, is to a large degree circular, with circumferential and radial streets centered on the central railroad station.

There are numerous crossings of the Elizabeth River. The city was once home to several smaller bascule bridges. The South First Street Bridge over the river, originally built in 1908, was replaced by a fixed span. The South Front Street Bridge, built in 1922, has been left in the open position since March 2011. A study is underway to determine if the bridge can be rehabilitated. The bridge is notable in that it is the only remaining movable road bridge in Union County (movable railroad bridges still exist).

Public transportation

Elizabeth is among the U.S. cities with the highest train ridership. It is served by NJ Transit on Amtrak's Northeast Corridor Line.  There are two active stations in Elizabeth. Elizabeth station, also called Broad Street Elizabeth or Midtown Station, is the southern station in Midtown Elizabeth. The other train station in Elizabeth is North Elizabeth station.

NJ Transit has planned a segment of the Newark-Elizabeth Rail Link (NERL), designated as the Union County Light Rail (UCLR). The UCLR was planned to connect Midtown Station with Newark Liberty International Airport and have seven or eight other stations in between within Elizabeth city limits. A possible extension of this future line to Plainfield would link the city of Elizabeth with the Raritan Valley Line.

ONE Bus provides service between Elizabeth and Newark on the 24 route.

Local media
WJDM at 1530 AM signed-on March 11, 1970 with studios at 9 Caldwell Place in Elizabeth. The station signed-off on January 30, 2019.

News 12 New Jersey offers weather and news channels with coverage of the city.

The Daily Journal was published in Elizabeth from 1779 to 1992, ending publication as circulation plummeted from a peak of 60,000.

Public-access channel
Residents of Elizabeth can tune into the public-access television cable-TV channel at any time to view public information, the city bulletin board, live meetings, important health information and tips. This service is provided by Optimum on channel 18. The channel also features the top ten ranked television shows, educational facts, quote of the day, gas price statistics, and tips for keeping the city safe and clean.

In popular culture
 In the opening credits of the HBO crime drama The Sopranos, part of the city is shown.
 The city is the focal point of Elizabeth native Judy Blume's 2015 novel In the Unlikely Event, the backdrop of which is three incidents that involved the crash of three commercial airliners in Elizabeth—1951 Miami Airlines C-46 crash, American Airlines Flight 6780 and National Airlines Flight 101—that took place within a period of two months in late 1951 and early 1952.
 Elizabeth is the hometown of Mary Dawn Dwyer Levov, the principal female character in Philip Roth's 1997 Pulitzer Prize-winning novel American Pastoral.

Notable people

People who were born in, residents of, or otherwise closely associated with Elizabeth include:

 Asad Abdul-Khaliq (born 1980), starting quarterback for the Minnesota Golden Gophers from 2000 to 2003
 Louis Abell (1884–1962), Olympic rower
 A. Bernard Ackerman (1936–2008), physician; a founding figure in the field of dermatopathology
 Ryan Adeleye (born 1985), Israeli-American professional soccer defender who has played for Hapoel Ashkelon
 Matthias W. Baldwin (1795–1866), inventor and machinery manufacturer, specializing in the production of steam locomotives, whose machine shop, established in 1825, grew to become Baldwin Locomotive Works
 John D. Bates (born 1946), Senior United States district judge of the United States District Court for the District of Columbia
 Eugene J. Bedell (1928–2016), politician who served in the New Jersey General Assembly from 1972 to 1982
 Stephen Bercik (1921–2003), politician; mayor of Elizabeth from 1956 to 1964
 Benjamin Blackledge (1743–1815), educator and public official
 Judy Blume (born 1938), author
 Elias Boudinot (1740–1821), President of the Continental Congress; early U.S. Congressman
 Todd Bowles (born 1963), head coach of the Tampa Bay Buccaneers and former NFL defensive back with the Washington Redskins and San Francisco 49ers
 David Brody (born 1930), historian; professor emeritus of history at the University of California, Davis
 Hubie Brown (born 1933), former basketball coach and current television analyst
 Antoinette Brown Blackwell (1825–1921), first woman to be ordained as a mainstream Protestant minister in the U.S.
 Robert Nietzel Buck (1914–2007), broke the junior transcontinental air speed record in 1930; youngest pilot ever licensed in the U.S.
 N. J. Burkett (born 1962), news correspondent for WABC-TV
 William Burnet (1730–1791), physician who represented New Jersey in the Continental Congress from 1780 to 1781
 Arthur Leopold Busch (1866–1956), submarine pioneer who constructed the USS Holland SS-1
 Deidre Davis Butler (1955–2020), lawyer, disability rights activist and federal official
 James G. Butler (1920–2005), trial lawyer who was known for winning many large verdicts for plaintiffs in civil litigation, including the first in a thalidomide case
 Nicholas Murray Butler (1862–1947), winner of the Nobel Peace Prize; a founder of the Carnegie Endowment for International Peace
 Elias B. Caldwell (1776–1825), Clerk of the Supreme Court of the United States
 Joan Carroll (1931–2016), actress, known for films such as Meet Me in St. Louis and The Bells of St. Mary's
 Rodney Carter (born 1964), former NFL running back/3rd down receiver with the Pittsburgh Steelers
 Al Catanho (born 1972), former linebacker in the NFL for the New England Patriots and the Washington Redskins
 John Catlin (1803–1874), acting Governor of Wisconsin Territory
 Gil Chapman (born 1953), running back and return specialist for the University of Michigan and New Orleans Saints
 Michael Chertoff (born 1953), United States Secretary of Homeland Security; was born and raised there
 Hiram Chodosh (born 1962), Fifth president of Claremont McKenna College in Claremont, California
 Abraham Clark (1725–1794), Member of the Continental Congress; signer of the Declaration of Independence
 Amos Clark Jr. (1828–1912), politician and businessman who represented New Jersey's 3rd congressional district from 1873 to 1875
 Freddie 'Red' Cochrane (1915–1993), professional boxer in the welterweight (147 lb) division who became World Champion in 1941 in that class
 Jim Colbert (born 1941), golfer and multiple winner on both the PGA Tour and Champions Tour
 Tom Colicchio (born 1962), restaurateur, chef, and judge on reality-TV program Top Chef
 Tom Coyne (1954–2017), mastering engineer
 Joseph Halsey Crane (1782–1851), Congressional representative from Ohio
 Elias Dayton (1737–1807), elected to the Continental Congress; served as mayor of Elizabethtown from 1796 to 1805; father of Jonathan Dayton
 Jonathan Dayton (1760–1824), signer of the United States Constitution and Speaker of the United States House of Representatives; born there; Dayton, Ohio is named for him
 John De Hart (1727–1795), delegate to the Continental Congress; was born and lived there
 DeCavalcante crime family, one of the biggest mafia families in the U.S., is based here
 Tom DeSanto (born 1968), film producer
 Thomas G. Dunn (–1998), seven-term mayor of Elizabeth whose 28 years in office made him the longest-serving mayor of a U.S. city with more than 100,000 people
 Drew Esocoff (born 1957), television sports director, who is the director of NBC Sunday Night Football
 John J. Fay Jr. (1927–2003), member of the New Jersey General Assembly and the New Jersey Senate
 Chuck Feeney (born 1931), businessman, philanthropist and the founder of The Atlantic Philanthropies, one of the largest private foundations in the world.
 Charles N. Fowler (1852–1932), represented 5th congressional district in the United States House of Representatives from 1895 to 1911
 Ron Freeman (born 1947), winner of the gold medal in the 4 × 400 m relay at the 1968 Summer Olympics in Mexico City; raised there and attended Thomas Jefferson High School
 Stanton T. Friedman (1934–2019), professional ufologist
 Minna Gale (1869–1944), Shakespearean actress
 Chris Gatling (born 1967), NBA player for the Golden State Warriors, Miami Heat, Dallas Mavericks, New Jersey Nets, Milwaukee Bucks, Orlando Magic, Denver Nuggets, and the Cleveland Cavaliers
 Tom Glassic (born 1954), retired NFL offensive lineman who played for the Denver Broncos
 William Halsey Jr. (1882–1959), admiral in the United States Navy during World War II, who was one of four individuals to have attained the rank of fleet admiral
 Alexander Hamilton (–1804), lived here as a young man upon first arriving in America
 John T. Hendrickson Jr. (1923–1999), politician who represented the 9th Legislative District in the New Jersey General Assembly from 1982 to 1989
 Joseph J. Higgins (1929–2007), politician who served in the New Jersey General Assembly from 1966 to 1974
 Kyrie Irving (born 1992), basketball player who plays professionally for the NBA's Brooklyn Nets
 Raghib Ismail (born 1969), former NFL and CFL player
 Horace Jenkins (born 1974), former NBA player for the Detroit Pistons
 Leo Warren Jenkins (1913–1989), educator who served as the sixth president and chancellor of what is now East Carolina University
 Marsha P. Johnson (1945–1992), LGBTQ activist
 I. Stanford Jolley (1900–1978), film and television actor who starred in the 1946 serial film The Crimson Ghost
 Phineas Jones (1819–1884), represented New Jersey's 6th congressional district from 1881 to 1883
 Arnie Kantrowitz (1940–2022), LGBT activist and college professor
 Michael Kasha (1926–2019), physical chemist and molecular spectroscopist who collaborated with Andres Segovia in the 1960s and 1970s to create the Kasha Design classical guitars
 John Kean (1852–1914), represented New Jersey in the United States Senate from 1899 to 1911; served two separate terms in the United States House of Representatives, from 1883 to 1885, and from 1887 to 1889, representing New Jersey's 3rd congressional district
 James C. Kellogg III (1915–1980), Chairman of the Port Authority of New York and New Jersey
 Daniel Hugh Kelly (born 1952), stage, film and television actor; was born and raised there
 Daniel C. Kurtzer (born 1949), United States Ambassador to Egypt from 1997 to 2001 and United States Ambassador to Israel from 2001 to 2005
 Chauncey D. Leake (1896–1978), pharmacologist, medical historian and ethicist
 Jay Lethal (born 1985 as Jamar Shipman), professional wrestler in Ring of Honor
 William Livingston (1723–1790), signer of the United States Constitution and the first elected Governor of New Jersey, he lived there and built his home, Liberty Hall
 Zenaida Manfugás (1932–2012), Cuban-American pianist who was considered one of the first black pianists in Cuba
 Emilie Martin (1869–1936), mathematician and professor of mathematics at Mount Holyoke College
 Patrick McDonnell (born 1956), cartoonist, author and playwright who is the creator of the syndicated daily comic strip Mutts
 James P. Mitchell (1900–1964), served as United States Secretary of Labor from 1953 to 1961; ran unsuccessfully for Governor of New Jersey
 Thomas Mitchell (1892–1962), Oscar and Tony Award-winning actor; was born there
 Hank Mobley (1930–1986), hard bop jazz saxophonist
 John Morris (1926–2018), film, television and broadway composer, dance arranger, conductor and trained concert pianist, best known for his collaborations with filmmakers Mel Brooks and Gene Wilder
 Don Newcombe (1926–2019), pitcher who spent most of his career with the Brooklyn/Los Angeles Dodgers
 Marissa Paternoster (born 1986), artist, singer and guitarist in the bands Screaming Females and Noun
 Elizabeth Peña (1959–2014), actress
 Lorenzo Da Ponte (1749–1838), Italian-born librettist and poet
Stephanie Pogue (1944–2002), artist, printmaker, and art educator
 Franklin Leonard Pope (1840–1885), telegrapher and inventor; lived there as a young man and befriended Thomas Edison
 Elazar Mayer Preil (1878-1933), rabbi who led Elizabeth's Othodox Jewish community.
 Ahmad Khan Rahami (born 1988), naturalized U.S. citizen from Afghanistan and Elizabeth restaurant worker charged in the 2016 New York and New Jersey bombings
 Ron Rivers (born 1971), running back in the NFL for six seasons
 Jon Rua (born 1983), actor, singer and choreographer who appeared in the Broadway hit Hamilton
 Jonal Saint-Dic (born 1985), NFL player with the Kansas City Chiefs
 Sidney M. Schreiber (1915–2009), Associate Justice of the New Jersey Supreme Court from 1975 to 1984
 Debralee Scott (1953–2005), actress, known for her role in Mary Hartman, Mary Hartman
 Martin J. Silverstein (born 1954), attorney and diplomat who served as the United States Ambassador to Uruguay under President George W. Bush from 2001 to 2005
 Mickey Spillane (1918–2006), writer
 Joseph Stamler (1911–1988), New Jersey Superior Court judge and professor at Rutgers University
 Leo Steiner (1939–1987), co-owner of the Carnegie Deli
 Edward Stratemeyer (1862–1930), creator of the Hardy Boys, Bobbsey Twins, and Nancy Drew, he was born and resided there
 William Sulzer (1863–1941), U.S. Congressman and impeached governor of New York
 Carole Beebe Tarantelli (born 1942), American-born former member of the Italian parliament who was the first American citizen elected to the Italian Chamber of Deputies
 Tay-K (born 2000), rapper, songwriter and convicted murderer whose song "The Race" went viral following his arrest in Elizabeth, after a nationwide manhunt for murder
 Craig Taylor (born 1966), former running back for three seasons for the Cincinnati Bengals
 Hal Tulchin (1926–2017), television and video director
 Daniel Van Pelt (born 1964), politician who represented the 9th legislative district in the New Jersey General Assembly from 2008, until 2009, when he resigned after being arrested in connection with Operation Bid Rig.
 General John W. Vogt Jr. (1920–2010), flying ace of the United States Army Air Forces in World War II who later  general rank in the United States Air Force during the Cold War era
 Dick Vosburgh (1929–2007), comedy writer and lyricist working chiefly in Britain
 Bernie Wagenblast (born 1956), broadcaster and journalist
 Bill Walczak, community activist who ran for mayor of Boston in 2013
 Mickey Walker (1903–1981), boxer; held the Welterweight and Middleweight titles; was born and raised there; ranked #10 on Sports Illustrateds list of The 50 Greatest New Jersey Sports Figures
 Mabel Madison Watson (1872-1952), composer and music educator
 Joe Weil (born 1958), writer and active member of the New Jersey poetry scene
 Henry S. Whitehead (1882–1932), Episcopal minister and author of horror and fantasy fiction
 Sam Woodyard (1925–1988), jazz drummer best known for his association with the Duke Ellington orchestra
 Glen Everett Woolfenden (1930–2007), ornithologist, known for his long-term study of the Florida scrub jay population at Archbold Biological Station near Lake Placid, Florida.
 Albert Capwell Wyckoff (1903–1953), ordained minister of the Presbyterian Church (USA) and author of juvenile fiction, most notably the Mercer Boys series and Mystery Hunter series

Sister cities
 Ribera, Sicily, Italy
 Kitami, Hokkaido, Japan, signed on June 12, 1969

References

External links

 
 Elizabeth Tourism website

 
1664 establishments in New Jersey
1855 establishments in New Jersey
Cities in Union County, New Jersey
County seats in New Jersey
Faulkner Act (mayor–council)
Former colonial and territorial capitals in the United States
New Jersey Urban Enterprise Zones
Port cities and towns in New Jersey
Populated places established in 1664
Populated places established in 1855